This list records the bishops of the Roman Catholic diocese of Bremen, supposedly a suffragan of the Archbishopric of Cologne, then of the bishops of Bremen, who were in personal union archbishops of Hamburg (simply titled Archbishops of Hamburg-Bremen), later simply titled archbishops of Bremen, since 1180 simultaneously officiating as rulers of princely rank (prince-archbishop) in the Prince-Archbishopric of Bremen (est. 1180 and secularised in 1648), a state of imperial immediacy within the Holy Roman Empire. Bremen and Hamburg were the seats of the chapters at Bremen Cathedral and Hamburg Concathedral, while the incumbents used to reside in their castle in Vörde since 1219.

Titles of the incumbents of the Bremian See 
Not all incumbents of the Bremian See were imperially invested princely power as Prince-Archbishops and not all were papally confirmed as bishops. In 1180 part of the Bremian diocesan territory and small parts of the neighbouring Diocese of Verden were disentangled from the Duchy of Saxony and became an own territory of imperial immediacy called Prince-Archbishopric of Bremen, a vassal of the Holy Roman Empire. The prince-archbishopric was an elective monarchy, with the monarch being the respective archbishop usually elected by the Bremian Chapters at Bremen Cathedral and Hamburg Concathedral, with the latter enfranchised to three capitular votes, and confirmed by the Holy See, or exceptionally only appointed by the Holy See. Papally confirmed archbishops were then invested by the emperor with the princely regalia, thus the title prince-archbishop. However, sometimes the respective incumbent of the see never gained a papal confirmation, but was still invested the princely regalia. Also the opposite occurred with a papally confirmed archbishop, never invested as prince. A number of incumbents, elected by the chapter, neither achieved papal confirmation nor imperial investiture, but as a matter of fact nevertheless de facto held the princely power. The respective incumbents of the see bore the following titles: 
 Bishop of Bremen from 787 to 845
 Archbishop of Hamburg and Bishop of Bremen in personal union (colloquially also Archbishop of Hamburg-Bremen) from 848 to 1072
 Archbishop of Bremen (colloquially also Archbishop of Hamburg-Bremen) from 1072 to 1179
 Prince-Archbishop of Bremen from 1180 to 1566, paralleled by the de facto rule of Catholic Administrators from 1316 to 1327 and again 1348 to 1360 
 Administrator of the Prince-Archbishopric of Bremen 1316 to 1327, 1348 to 1360, and again 1568 to 1645. Either simply de facto replacing the Prince-Archbishop or lacking canon-law prerequisites the incumbent of the see would officially only hold the title administrator (but nevertheless colloquially referred to as Prince-Archbishop). Between 1568 and 1645 all administrators were Lutherans, while else they were Roman Catholics. 
 The last, but only provisional incumbent of the See, Francis of Wartenberg, therefore bore the title Vicar Apostolic (1645–1648)

Catholic Bishops of Bremen till 845

Catholic Archbishops of Hamburg in personal union Bishops of Bremen (848–1072)

Catholic Archbishops of Bremen (1072–1179)

Catholic Prince-Archbishops of Bremen (1180–1316)

Catholic Administrators (1316–1327; 1345–1362) and Prince-Archbishops of Bremen (1327–1348)

Catholic Prince-Archbishops and Administrator of Bremen (1348–1496)

Catholic Prince-Archbishops of Bremen (1497–1568)

Lutheran Administrators of the Prince-Archbishopric of Bremen (1568–1645)

Roman Catholic Administrators and Vicars Apostolic, 1635/1645–Secularisation

 
Bremen
Bremen, Prince-Archbishopric of
Bremen, Prince-Archbishopric of